The River Stinchar is a river in South Ayrshire, Scotland.

It is reputed poet Robert Burns fished the river, and despite being impressed by its beauty, was unable to find words to rhyme with the name.

In the mid-20th century, William MacFarlane and his family, who lived in nearby Pinmore Lodge among , built motor boats under the brand of Stinchar Craft.

See also
Kilwinnet

Stinchar